Above the Mountains or  Boven de Bergen  is a 1992 Dutch film directed by Digna Sinke.

Cast
Rosmarie Blaauboer	 ... 	Neeltje
Catherine ten Bruggencate	... 	Rina
Eric Corton	... 	Jean Paul
Renée Fokker	... 	Hélène
Esgo Heil	... 	Stefan
Johan Leysen	... 	Vincent
Sacco van der Made	... 	Veerman
Kees Hulst	... 	Vader Jean Paul
Maartje Molenaar	... 	Kleine Rita
Stan Diepenmaat	... 	Igor
Rian Schepens	... 	Campingbeheerster
Anne van Dijk	... 	Vader
Marietje Noordkamp	... 	Moeder
Gerard Dunhof	... 	Oom Piet
Patricia Timmerman ...     Chips-meisje en Badminton speelster
Hennie Kok

External links 
 

Dutch drama films
1992 films
1990s Dutch-language films
Films directed by Digna Sinke